Line 1 of the Shijiazhuang Metro is a rapid transit line in Shijiazhuang, Hebei province, China. The line opened on 26 June 2017.

History
Phase 1
Phase 1 of the line began construction on 1 July 2013 and began service on 26 June 2017, completed at a cost of ¥18.892 billion.

Phase 2 initial section
Only 6 stations from Xiaohedadao to Fuze (10.4 km) opened on 26 June 2019.

Phase 2 North section
Two more stations, Dongshangze and Dongyang will open later. The section is 3.1 km in length with 2 stations. The section will open in 2024.

Phase 3 (Southwest extension)
The Phase 3 will add two more stations (Huai'anlu and Shangzhuang) in Southwest of the line. The extension is under planning.

Opening timeline

Stations

Rolling stock
Services are provided by CRRC Tangshan Type A rolling stock, which are operated in six-car sets that hold up to 2520 passengers each.

References

01
Railway lines opened in 2017